Boardley may refer to:

Carl Boardley, English motor-racing driver
Stuart Boardley (born 1985), English professional footballer
William J. Boardley, former brigadier general in the Pennsylvania Air National Guard
Boardley, Virginia, an unincorporated community in King and Queen County, Virginia